Warnervale is a town in the Australian state of New South Wales. It lies approximately 95 km north of the Sydney CBD, located west of Tuggerah Lake, a large shallow coastal lake, and just north of Wyong.

History
The development of Warnervale was first undertaken by Albert Hamlyn Warner who in 1893 acquired  of land in the area. Warner was probably one of the Wyong area's most notable residents and was strongly influenced by his travels in both Japan and the United States, which is today evidenced in road names in surrounding suburbs such as Minnesota, Virginia, Louisiana, Hiawatha and Nikko, as well as his family home which was named 'Hakone' after a park he had seen in Japan. Warnervale was first identified as a growth area in the Sydney Region Outline Plan in 1968.

Over time the area originally known as Warnervale has been gradually subdivided into a number of other suburbs, including Kanwal, Watanobbi, Hamlyn Terrace, Wadalba and Woongarrah. Once composed of large acreages and significant wetlands, the area has rapidly been developed into a series of residential estates, although none of these have yet been built within the suburb of Warnervale's boundaries. In 1988-9, American actor Matthew McConaughey resided in Warnervale for one year on exchange.

Future developments
The current development framework for Warnervale, elaborated in the Warnervale District Planning Strategy (2002), is to construct a $100 million,  town centre which will become the main centre for the Wyong Shire and cater for projected growth in the Warnervale-Wadalba region from 5,000 (2002 estimate) to 40,000 by 2021. The proposed development includes residential components, transport links including a new railway station, shops, restaurants, entertainment and a range of community facilities including an aquatic centre, library, seniors' centre and parkland, and the centre is planned to be built on a mix of privately owned, council-owned and state-owned land. It was hoped by Wyong Shire Council that the creation of a new city would revive older areas such as Wyong, Toukley and Long Jetty, which had suffered from the construction of large regional shopping centres such as Lakehaven Shopping Centre and Westfield Tuggerah.

Much of the Warnervale area lies in a mine subsidence region however, constraining some large commercial or industrial project designs.

In September 2006, it was announced that the proposed town centre would be built north of Sparks Road, adjacent to the proposed new railway station, following recommendations by planning expert Peter Seamer.

Warnervale Airport controversy
Controversy arose over plans which had originated in the late 1970s to convert the small Warnervale Airport into a commercial and freight airport and regional hub, expected in 1995 to operate 24 hours a day and cater for 65,000 flights annually - even as the state's property development agency, Landcom, was advertising estates in the area as "tranquil". The upgrade was expected in 1994 to cost 6 million, and a proposal by Traders Finance Australia to develop the airport was accepted in January 1995, with contracts being signed in July 1995. Residents responded by forming the Central Coast Airport Action Group, and taking the Wyong Shire Council to the Land and Environment Court to fight the move. The action failed, and Wyong Shire Council demanded payment of costs from the residents group. However, the State Government intervened, passing the Warnervale Airport (Restrictions) Act 1996, which restricted future aircraft movements, the length and siting of the runway, and any future expansion of airport operations, and compensating residents for $65,000 in legal bills. In 1999, the Wyong Shire Council proposed extending the runway to 1600 metres to cater for jet aircraft of between 50 and 116 passengers, but the plans were eventually scrapped in a council meeting in February 2003 which decided instead to focus on job creation as a driver for the area's growth, including assisting the establishment of a $100 million distribution centre for Woolworths Limited on part of the land initially earmarked for the airport upgrade.

Demographics

Facilities
Warnervale presently has relatively few facilities. A number of new schools have been erected in the area, including MacKillop Catholic College and Lakes Grammar - An Anglican School, to service the high youth population, but most of the workforce must commute, with over 25% working in the state capital Sydney in 2002.  Warnervale train station lies on the Main North railway line. It is served by the Central Coast & Newcastle Line of the NSW TrainLink network, allowing transport between Newcastle and Sydney. There is currently a café operating near the Warnervale train station, which also functions as a newsagency.

Warnervale Wildcats Sport Club is a rapidly growing club offering sporting activities for junior and seniors in Rugby Union, Netball and Cricket.

References

External links
 Warnervale Airport (Restrictions) Act 1996 (AustLII)
 Warnies Link

Further reading
 

Suburbs of the Central Coast (New South Wales)
Towns in New South Wales